Brian Deegan  (born May 9, 1974) is an American professional freestyle motocross rider and racing driver.

Deegan was the first to do a twisting backflip 360 in competition. With a total of 10 medals (two golds and seven bronzes), he is the most decorated Freestyle Motocross rider in X Games history and the only rider to have competed in at least one event in every X Games.

A co-founder of the Metal Mulisha clothing line, Deegan is one of the most recognizable names in action sports. He earned 10 XG medals in Moto X, before he made the transition to four wheels. In 2010, Deegan earned double silver in Racing and RallyCross. In 2011, he took RallyCross gold and came back to earn bronze in 2012.

Racing career

Deegan became a pro supercross rider with Team Moto XXX at age 17. In 1997 at the LA Coliseum, Deegan won the 125cc main and ghost rode his bike across the finish line. This was the beginning of what we know today as Freestyle Motocross.

In 2004, at the Winter X Games, Deegan crashed while attempting a twisting backflip 360 over a 100 ft snow double, breaking his femur and both wrists. He came back 6 months later to place fourth at the Summer X Games.

Switching to four wheels in 2009, Deegan ventured into short course off-road racing in the Lucas Oil Off Road Racing Series' Unlimited Lites division. He ultimately won the championship over more experienced off-road drivers.

At the 2010 X Games, Deegan competed in the Rally Car event at the Los Angeles Memorial Coliseum. He finished second behind Tanner Foust after making a wrong turn during the race. He also competed in Rally Car Super Rally, again finishing second behind Tanner Foust.

At X Games XVII, Deegan won gold in RallyCross.

In 2011, he won the World Championship race at Crandon International Off-Road Raceway in the Traxxas TORC Series. He also won the Pro Lite Unlimited and Pro 2 class championships in the Lucas Oil Off Road Racing Series. In addition, he represented the U.S. with teammate Travis Pastrana in the Race of Champions (ROC) competition held in Germany. ROC is an international competition that  invites top drivers from around the world to compete in a series of different racing events.

In 2012, he debuted the Metal Mulisha Monster truck. Todd LeDuc officially debuted it at Reliant Stadium in Houston, Texas in January 2012. Deegan drove the truck in Phoenix, Arizona at Chase Field. Deegan also won his second championship in the Pro 2 class of the Lucas Oil Off Road Racing Series.

Deegan raced an OlsbergsMSE Ford Fiesta in the Global RallyCross Championship, earning runner-up in 2012, fourth in 2013 and 12th in 2014. He also continued his Lucas Oil Off Road Racing Series career, winning the Pro Light Unlimited championship in 2013 and the Pro 2 championship in 2014. In 2015, Deegan was hired by Chip Ganassi Racing to compete in seven Global Rallycross Championship races in an M-Sport Fiesta along with former professional motocross rider Jeff Ward.

Media appearances
During a 2005 taping of MTV's Viva La Bam, Deegan under-rotated a back-flip and suffered a strong impact from the handle bars in his midsection, almost losing his life. He lost a kidney, lacerated his spleen, and lost a significant amount of blood. He now has a long scar down his stomach, that he calls his "zipper", spanning almost his entire abdomen, as a result of the accident. At the end of the episode when it originally aired, Bam dedicated it to Brian. The accident was cut out of the show.

In 2006, Deegan and Berkela films released a film entitled Disposable Hero that follows him through the struggles and rewards that accompany the freestyle motocross sport and lifestyle. Jesse James, Ronnie Faisst, Jeremy Stenberg, Cameron Steele, Chris Ackerman, Nate Adams, and Seth Enslow are a few of the featured cast that talk about Deegan and his life's journeys. The film aired on Spike TV on December 5, 2007.

Deegan performed stunts in the movie Fantastic Four.

He has been on the cover of Transworld MX and Racer X magazines and has been featured  multiple times in FHM magazine.

Deegan was in the Game Boy Advance/Nintendo GameCube/PlayStation 2 video game Freekstyle. He also appeared in the 2000 game Supercross for the PlayStation.

In 2018, Deegan was the subject of the documentary Blood Line: The Life and Times of Brian Deegan.

Other ventures
In addition to supporting riders, the Metal Mulisha has a clothing line and other related merchandise. Deegan also has a toy line called Hevy Hitters distributed in retail locations such as Walmart. Most recently he teamed up with Illektron to create Battlez FMX, a collectible card and dice game featuring Deegan, Todd Potter and Jeremy Lusk.

He is the former owner of the FMX park, the Compound, which he later sold to Nate Adams. At the 2007 X Games Deegan stated he sometimes regrets selling it.

Personal life
He has been married to Marissa Deegan since 2003. Together, they have three children: Hailie Deegan, who currently competes full-time in the NASCAR Truck Series driving for ThorSports Racing; Haiden, who was recently signed to Team Star Yamaha as a amateur/pro rider; and Hudson, who competes in youth motocross.

Deegan became a born-again Christian after a near-fatal crash in 2005.

Career highlights
 1997 Los Angeles Supercross 125cc – 1st place
 1999 World Freestyle Champ
 2000 Air MX Champ
 2000 Bluetorch Ride and Slide FMX Champ  
 2003 Featured Rider on Tony Hawk tour
 2003 EXPN Rider of the year nominee
 First to land a 360
 2004 ESPY award nominee
 Hold the most medals in FMX X Games history: 10 medals
 2004 ESPN top 100 athlete of all sports
 2007 Winner Best Biography X Dance Action Sports Film Festival for Brian Deegan: Disposable Hero
 2009 Awarded The Lifetime Achievement Award At The Transworld Motocross Awards In Las Vegas.
 1 gold and 5 medals at the X Games rally events.
 2nd at the 2012 Global RallyCross Championship.
 4th at the 2013 Global RallyCross Championship.
 2009, 2011 and 2013 Lucas Oil Off Road Racing Series Pro Lite Unlimited champion
 2011, 2012 and 2014 Lucas Oil Off Road Racing Series Pro 2 Unlimited champion
 2011 World Championship race winner in the Pro Light truck class
 2022 Summit Racing Freedom 500 race winner at the Freedom Factory

Racing record

Complete Global RallyCross Championship results

Supercar

Race cancelled.

References

External links

 Brian Deegan's official website
 Metal Mulisha website
 Disposable Hero website
 
 

1974 births
Living people
American motocross riders
X Games athletes
Freestyle motocross riders
Global RallyCross Championship drivers
American Christians
European Rallycross Championship drivers
Chip Ganassi Racing drivers